Hector the Bulldog is an animated cartoon character in the Warner Bros. Looney Tunes and Merrie Melodies series of cartoons. Hector is a muscle-bound bulldog with gray fur (except in A Street Cat Named Sylvester and Greedy for Tweety, where his fur is yellowish) and walks pigeon-toed. His face bears a perpetual scowl between two immense jowls. He usually wears a black collar with silver studs.

History
His first prototype appearance was in 1942's Double Chaser.

Hector's first true appearance was in 1945's Peck Up Your Troubles, where he foils Sylvester's attempts to get a woodpecker. He made a second appearance in A Hare Grows in Manhattan, leading a street gang composed of dogs in a Friz Freleng-directed short; this is also the only short where the dog has numerous speaking lines. Besides these starring roles, Hector is a minor player in several Tweety and Sylvester cartoons directed by Freleng in 1948 and throughout the 1950s. His usual role is to protect Tweety from Sylvester, usually at Granny's request. He typically does this through brute strength alone, but some cartoons have him outsmart the cat, such as 1954's Satan's Waitin', wherein Hector (as Satan) convinces Sylvester to use up his nine lives by pursuing Tweety through a series of extremely dangerous situations. In most of his appearances, the bulldog is nameless, though he is sometimes referred to as Spike, not to be confused with Freleng's other creation Spike who is often paired with Chester the Terrier.

Later appearances
Hector was going to have a cameo in Who Framed Roger Rabbit, but was later dropped for unknown reasons.

Hector’s most prominent role was as a regular cast member in the animated series The Sylvester and Tweety Mysteries. In the cartoon, he plays Granny's loyal guardian. The show makes Hector's low intelligence his Achilles heel, as Sylvester is constantly outwitting him.

Hector appeared in Looney Tunes Cartoons, where he appeared as a military sergeant who tries to protect Tweety from Sylvester.

Hector appears in Bugs Bunny Builders.

References

Fictional dogs
Looney Tunes characters
Film characters introduced in 1945